The Roman Catholic Diocese of Buenaventura is a Latin suffragan diocese in the Ecclesiastical province of Cali in Colombia, yet depends on the missionary Roman Congregation for the Evangelization of Peoples.

Its cathedral episcopal see is Catedral de San Buenaventura, dedicated to Saint Bonaventura, in the city of Buenaventura, Valle del Cauca Department.

History 
 14 November 1952: Established as Apostolic Vicariate of Buenaventura, on territories split off from the then Diocese of Cali and Apostolic Prefecture of Tumaco (now a diocese)
 30 November 1996: Promoted as Diocese of Buenaventura / Bonaventuren(sis) (Latin)

Statistics 
As per 2014, it pastorally served 434,000 Catholics (98.0% of 443,000 total) on 6,633 km² in 21 parishes and 84 missions with 38 priests (25 diocesan, 13 religious), 24 lay religious (13 brothers, 11 sisters) and 7 seminarians.

Episcopal Ordinaries 
(all Roman rite)

Apostolic Vicars of Buenaventura 
 Gerardo Valencia Cano, M.X.Y. (born Vanuatu) (1953.03.24 – death 1972.01.21), Titular Bishop of Rhesaina (1953.03.24 – 1972.01.21), previously Apostolic Prefect of Mitú (Colombia) (1949.07.19 – 1953.03.24)
 Heriberto Correa Yepes, M.X.Y. (first native incumbent) (1973.01.29 – retired 1996.11.30), Titular Bishop of Casæ nigræ (1973.01.29 – death 2010.09.09); previously Apostolic Prefect of Mitú (Colombia) (1953.03.27 – 1967)

Diocesan Bishops of Buenaventura 
 Rigoberto Corredor Bermúdez (1996.11.30 – 2003.12.19), previously Titular Bishop of Rusguniæ (1988.02.26 – 1996.11.30) as Auxiliary Bishop of Diocese of Pereira (Colombia) (1988.02.26 – 1996.11.30); later Bishop of Garzón (Colombia) (2003.12.19 – 2011.07.15), Bishop of above Pereira (2011.07.15 – ...) 
''Apostolic Administrator Juan Francisco Sarasti Jaramillo, C.I.M. (2004.02.21 – 2004.04.29), while Metropolitan Archbishop of Cali (Colombia) (2002.08.17 – retired 2011.05.18); previously Titular Bishop of Egara (1978.03.08 – 1983.12.23) as Auxiliary Bishop of Archdiocese of Cali (1978.03.08 – 1983.12.23), Bishop of Barrancabermeja (Colombia) (1983.12.23 – 1993.03.25), Metropolitan Archbishop of Ibagué (Colombia) (1993.03.25 – 2002.08.17)
 Héctor Epalza Quintero, P.S.S. (2004.04.29 – retired 2017.06.30)
 Rubén Darío Jaramillo Montoya (2017.06.30 – ...), no previous prelature.

So far, the diocese had no auxiliary bishops.

See also
 List of Catholic dioceses in Colombia
 Roman Catholicism in Colombia

Notes and references

Sources and external links 
 GCatholic.org, with Google satellite photo - data for all sections
 Catholic Hierarchy

Roman Catholic dioceses in Colombia
Roman Catholic Ecclesiastical Province of Cali
Roman Catholic dioceses and prelatures established in the 20th century
Religious organizations established in 1952
1952 establishments in Colombia